Anandavana Agadi is located near the city of Haveri in the southern state of Karnataka, India. Here, Shri Sheshachala Swamy lived. There is a beautiful Shiva temple in the city and an annual fair is organised on a grand scale. Within the campus, a Sanskrit school is run by the present Swamiji - Shri Chidambaramurthy Chakravarthy. A monthly Kannada magazine by the name of Sadhbhoda Chandrike has been printed and published in Anandavana since the early 1900s. There is an offset printing press for the purpose of printing Sadhbodha Chandrike. Shri Gurudatt Chakravarthy looks after the entire dtp, printing, correction and distribution of the magazine. Shri Sheshala Sadguru High School is also run by the mutt for the rural students and is aided by the government of Karnataka. It has also run a free health care camp on the first and third Sunday of every month since 2000. An annual celebration of the jayanthi (Birthday) of Shri Sheshala Sadguru is celebrated for over a week when thousands of people gather to pull the chariot on the 5th(Panchami) day of the Fair. The devotees have praised daily at the mutt itself.

Sadhbodha Chandrike has been conferred the prestigious state award "Karnataka Rajyotsava Prashasthi" for the year 2005 in the field of Literature by the Government of Karnataka. And also the "Karnataka Media Academy Award" has been conferred for the excellent service rendered to the development of Kannada literature and culture.

Cities and towns in Haveri district
Western Chalukya Empire